Syeda Bilgrami Imam (born 9 November 1941) is a writer and activist based in New Delhi, India. She was a member of the National Commission for Minorities (NCM), India, and has authored a book titled The Untold Charminar, which describes the culture of Hyderabad.

Honours and recognitions
Imam has received awards for both her literary contributions as well as social activities. Some of her works were shown at film festivals such as the Cannes and New York. As an advertising professional, she is a recipient of national and international awards including the "Indira Super Achiever Award" presented by the Institute of Change Management, Pune.

References

1941 births
Living people
English-language writers from India
Writers from Hyderabad, India
Indian Muslims
20th-century Indian women writers
20th-century Indian writers
Women writers from Telangana
Indian women scholars
Elphinstone College alumni
Educators from Andhra Pradesh
Women educators from Andhra Pradesh
People from Bilgram